Ogcocephalus corniger, the longnose batfish, is a species of batfish found at depths between  in the Atlantic Ocean, ranging from North Carolina to the Gulf of Mexico and the Bahamas. Like other members of the family Ogcocephalidae, it has a flat triangular body with coloring varying from yellowish to purple with pale, round spots. The lips are orange-red. Projecting from its head is a characteristic structure that is shared by other anglerfish.

References

External links 
 
 Longnose Batfish Ogcocephalus corniger at iNaturalist
 Longnose Batfish Ogcocephalus corniger at Idaho Species 

Ogcocephalidae
Fish described in 1980
Taxa named by Margaret G. Bradbury